The spot-winged falconet (Spiziapteryx circumcincta) is a species of bird of prey in subfamily Falconinae of family Falconidae, the falcons and caracaras. It is found in Argentina, Bolivia, Paraguay, and possibly Uruguay.

Taxonomy

The spot-winged falconet is the only member of genus Spiziapteryx and has no subspecies. Though by size and shape it appears to be a typical falcon, genetic data place it closer to the caracaras.

Description

Its wingspan is  The sexes are alike, and juveniles have the same plumage as adults. The species is stocky with shortish wings and a fairly long tail. Their head, back, and wings are grayish brown with white spots on the wings and shoulders and a white rump. They have a pale supercilium that extends onto the neck. They have black ear coverts and a narrow black "moustache". Their throat is white, their breast, flanks, and upper belly are grayish with narrow brown streaks, and their lower belly is white. Their central tail feathers are dark and the rest dark with white bars and tips. Their iris is pale yellow, their cere and lores are rich yellow, and their legs and feet cream to yellow.

Distribution and habitat

The spot-winged falconet is found from Bolivia's Santa Cruz Department south through Paraguay into Argentina as far south as Río Negro Province. Sight records in Uruguay unconfirmed by photographs or specimens lead the South American Classification Committee of the American Ornithological Society to treat it as hypothetical in that country. The spot-winged falconet inhabits the Gran Chaco in mostly-open landscapes such as savanna and semi-arid woodlands; all are characterized by scrub with scattered trees.

Behavior

Movement

The spot-winged falconet is believed to be a year-round resident, though individuals have wandered great distances.

Feeding

The spot-winged falconet's hunting techniques have not been fully described, but it is known to still-hunt from a perch. Its diet includes insects of many orders, lizards, small mammals, and birds as large as the rufous hornero (Furnarius rufus) and monk parakeet (Myiopsitta monachus).

Breeding

The spot-winged falconet lays eggs in Argentina during November and December. Birds in breeding condition have also been recorded between July and October, hinting at double-brooding. It nests in enclosed woven nests of other bird species such as cacholotes and in the active communal nests of monk parakeets. The clutch size is two to four eggs; the incubation period is not known; fledging is believed to occur about 33 days after hatch. Details of parental care are not known.

Vocalization

The spot-winged falconet's main call is a "distinctive nasal clucking constantly repeated, each note falling in pitch with a wailing effect"; it gives this when disturbed at the nest. The species also makes "a loud, guttural "kronk, kronk, kronk..."."

Status

The IUCN has assessed the spot-winged falconet as being of Least Concern. It has a somewhat limited range and its population size is not known, but the latter is believed to be stable. No immediate threats have been identified. Its "[p]referred habitat is not among those most seriously devastated in the region."

References

spot-winged falconet
Birds of Argentina
Birds of Paraguay
Birds of Uruguay
spot-winged falconet
Taxonomy articles created by Polbot